Sarıbalta can refer to:

 Sarıbalta, Çemişgezek
 Sarıbalta, Çermik